The Wellington Carnegie Library, located at 121 W. Seventh in Wellington, Kansas, is a Carnegie library built in c.1916.  It was listed on the National Register of Historic Places in 1987.

It is one of 63 Carnegie libraries built in Kansas during the early 20th century.  It is Classical Revival in style.

References

Libraries on the National Register of Historic Places in Kansas
Neoclassical architecture in Kansas
Library buildings completed in 1916
National Register of Historic Places in Sumner County, Kansas
Carnegie libraries in Kansas